

References

Parks and open spaces in Cumbria
Cumbria
King G
Lists of buildings and structures in Cumbria